Inflatable rats, or union rats, are giant inflatables in the shape of cartoon rats, commonly used in the United States by protesting or striking trade unions. They serve as a sign of opposition against employers or nonunion contractors, and are intended to call public attention to companies employing nonunion labor.

History

The first known inflatable rat was used by the International Union of Operating Engineers Local 150 in Plainfield, Illinois in 1989, according to photos from the Local 150 Engineer in November 1989, where it also launched a "Name the Rat" contest. In January of 1990, it announced that "Scabby" was the winning submission, coming from Local 150 member Lou Mahieu. Other unions also began using inflatable rats in the 1990s to shame companies that employ nonunion labor. 

Employers have filed lawsuits charging that the use of the giant inflatable rats constituted unlawful picketing, and some courts have agreed. In May 2011, the National Labor Relations Board (NLRB) held that union use of an inflatable monster rat is not considered an unlawful activity when directed at a secondary employer. In 2011 National Labor Relations Board (NLRB) in Sheet Metal Workers Local 15, 356 NLRB No. 162 (2011) ruled that the inflatable rat did not constitute a signal picket, but instead, constituted symbolic speech which is not subject to secondary boycott rules. This holding allows the union not only to place the inflatable rats at neutral entrances, but also to place them at locations where the picketed company is absent. In 2017, NLRB general counsel Peter B. Robb filed court motions seeking to change the previous policy, arguing that the presence of the inflatable rat was "confrontational, threatening, and coercive". Robb's complaint was set aside by a 3-1 vote of the NLRB on July 21, 2021.

Appearance

While the inflatable rat sometimes varies in appearance and size, it generally features large teeth and grotesque features, particularly a scabby belly, a reference to the nickname of "scab" that is given to strikebreakers and non-striking workers. Many unions have nicknamed the inflatable rat "Scabby the Rat," a name which originated from the International Union of Operating Engineers Local 150, who pioneered the use of the rat in 1989 and whose member Lou Mahieu won the "Name the Rat" contest with his submission of "Scabby".

United Kingdom
The inflatable rat appeared in the UK for the first time in 2012 and again at the 2013 Grangemouth Oil Refinery dispute.

See also
 List of inflatable manufactured goods

References

Mice and rats in popular culture
Rat
Labor relations
Protest tactics